Georgy Porfiryevich Sudeykin (11 April 1850 – 16 December 1883 Saint Petersburg) was a Russian Gendarme colonel, the inspector of the Saint Petersburg Department for Protection of Communal Security and Order. He was killed by his own double agent, Sergey Degayev.

Sudeykin was born into a noble family. In the 1870s, after graduating from a Cadet school, he served in the Kiev Gendarme Directorate. In 1879, he exposed the entire Kiev branch of the Narodnaya Volya terrorist organization, and he was quickly promoted to the top of the Okhrana hierarchy. In 1881, he became the Head of the Secret Department of Saint Petersburg, responsible for coordination of all secret agents in the capital of the Russian Empire. In 1882, a special position of the Inspector of the Secret Police was created for Sudeykin. There, he supervised all the secret agents of Okhrana.

Sudeykin had managed to recruit one of the Narodnaya Volya leaders, Sergey Degayev, as his agent. According to Degayev, Sudeykin sounded almost like a revolutionary himself, referring to the tsarist regime as rotten and promising that eventually Sudeykin and Degayev would rule Russia, with Degayev helping to wipe out Sudeykin's enemies through the auspices of Narodnaya Volya, and Sudeykin removing all challengers to Degayev's leadership within Narodnaya Volya by employing the assistance of Okhrana. Degayev's information led to arrest of Narodnaya Volya's leader Vera Figner and many other important members of the organization.

Narodnaya Volya eventually exposed Degayev's betrayal. They offered to spare his life if Degayev assassinated Sudeykin. Degayev requested secret meetings with Sudeykin. For unexpected reasons, Sudeykin did not attend the first two of those meetings. Sudeykin came to the third meeting, however, and Degayev killed him by shooting him in the back on 16 December 1883. Degayev, with the help of Narodnaya Volya, managed to escape from Russia to the United States, where he lived under the name of Alexander Pell.

Awards
 Order of Saint Anna 4 degrees
 Cash bonuses

References

1850 births
1883 deaths
Russian police officers
Russian terrorism victims